The Beautiful Adventure is a 1932 German romantic comedy film directed by Reinhold Schünzel and starring Käthe von Nagy, Wolf Albach-Retty and Alfred Abel. It was shot at the Babelsberg Studios in Berlin and premiered at the city's Gloria-Palast cinema. The film's sets were designed by the art director Werner Schlichting. A separate French language version was also made.

Plot
On her wedding day a young bride takes off with her cousin, who she has always loved.

Cast

See also
 The Beautiful Adventure (1917 film)
 The Beautiful Adventure (1942 film)

References

Bibliography

External links 
 

1932 films
Films of the Weimar Republic
German romantic comedy films
1932 romantic comedy films
1930s German-language films
Films directed by Reinhold Schünzel
UFA GmbH films
German multilingual films
German films based on plays
Films set in France
German black-and-white films
1932 multilingual films
1930s German films
Films shot at Babelsberg Studios